Johannes Baumgartner (14 October 1927 – 23 June 2021) was a Swiss middle-distance runner. He competed in the men's 800 metres at the 1952 Summer Olympics.

References

External links
 

1927 births
2021 deaths
Athletes (track and field) at the 1952 Summer Olympics
Swiss male middle-distance runners
Olympic athletes of Switzerland
Place of birth missing